Cinnamomum kanehirae (Chinese name niu zhang(牛樟)), also known as small-flowered camphor tree, or stout camphor tree, is a tree within the genus Cinnamomum of the family Lauraceae endemic to Taiwan.

Characteristics 
The tree can grow up to 30 m tall, 2 m across; evergreen trees; bark brown, fissured; branchlets glabrous, and yellow-green in color; leaves alternate, coriaceous, entire, margins often wavy, broadly ovate, ovate to elliptic, polished, 10–15 cm long, 4–7.5 cm wide, green and glabrous on both sides, usually with 0–3 or often 5 main veins, rarely with pinnate veins, lateral veins 2–3 pairs, short acute at apex, obtuse-rounded at base; petioles 1.4–3 cm long, grooved above. Inflorescences cymes, terminal; bracts of flowers pubescent outside, 2–3 mm across; perianth 6, pale-yellow, oblong, 2 mm long, tomentose at base inside, 1st and 2nd whorls of stamens 0.5 mm long, tomentose at base inside, anthers 4-celled, eglandular, introrse, 3rd whorl of stamens with glands, tomentose at base inside, anthers 4-celled, extrorse. Berry compressed-obconic or globose, l.2-1.3 cm long, l.2-1.5 cm across, green to blackish-violet, slightly pubescent to glabrous; seeds globose, 1 cm across, rounded on both sides. Flowering Nov. to December.; Fruiting Sept. to October.

Habitat 
This species is present at 200–2,000 m, mixed with C. micranthum in broad-leaved forests throughout Taiwan.

Uses 
It commonly used in carving or manufacturing equipments, and sometimes used in furniture; branches and leaves can also be distilled and obtained wood essential oils.

Gallery

References 

kanehirae
Endemic flora of Taiwan
Plants described in 1913
Taxa named by Bunzō Hayata